Mama Said Knock You Out is a 1990 album by LL Cool J. 

Mama Said Knock You Out may also refer to:

 "Mama Said Knock You Out" (song), a 1990 song by LL Cool J
 "Mama Said Knock You Out", a 1995 episode of New York Undercover
 "Mama Said Knock You Out", a 1996 episode of Moesha
 "Mama Said Knock You Out", a 2004 episode of Yes, Dear
 "Mama Said Knock You Out", a 2014 episode of the third season of Scandal